Silver chlorite is a chemical compound with the formula AgClO2. This slightly yellow solid is shock sensitive and has an orthorhombic crystal structure.

Preparation
Silver chlorite is prepared by the reaction of silver nitrate and sodium chlorite:

Reactions and properties
If normally heated, it explodes violently at 105 °C:

If heated very carefully, it decomposes at 156 °C to form silver chloride. It can also decompose to silver chlorate is chlorous acid is present.

Silver chlorite reacts explosively with various substances such as sulfur and hydrochloric acid, forming silver chloride. It also gets reduced by sulfur dioxide, and reacts with sulfuric acid to form chlorine dioxide. This compound explodes in contact with iodomethane and iodoethane.

Silver chlorite complexes
Silver chlorite can react with anhydrous ammonia to form triammonia-silver chlorite:

References

Silver compounds
Chlorites